Thomas Dufour (born 12 February 1973) is a French curler. He currently skips the French national team.

Career

Thomas Dufour has played in:

 2 Olympic Games, the 2002 Salt Lake City Winter Olympics and the 2010 Vancouver Winter Olympics.
 8 World Curling Championships.
 15 European Curling Championships.
 5 World Junior Curling Championships (1990, 1991, 1992, 1993, 1994).

Dufour's best placing at the World Championships was a fifth-place finish in 2008 and 2011. At the 2010 Olympics, the team finished 7th, where they made a terrific shot to win their first game against china.

Dufour won two medals in his junior career. In 1992, he won the silver medal at the World Juniors, playing lead for Jan Henri Ducroz. In 1993, he won the bronze medal playing third for Spencer Mugnier.

He also won a bronze medal at the 2011 World Mixed Doubles Curling Championship coaching Pauline Jeanneret and Amaury Pernette.

In 2008	he won the Colin Campbell Award (best spormantship during the worlds)

Teams

Notes

External links
 

Living people
1973 births
French male curlers
Curlers at the 2002 Winter Olympics
Curlers at the 2010 Winter Olympics
Olympic curlers of France
People from Chamonix
Sportspeople from Haute-Savoie